Dr. Broadway is a 1942 American mystery film directed by Anthony Mann (as his directorial debut) and written by Art Arthur. The film stars Macdonald Carey, Jean Phillips, Eduardo Ciannelli, Richard Lane, J. Carrol Naish, Joan Woodbury and Arthur Loft. The film was released on May 9, 1942, by Paramount Pictures.

Plot

After foiling a phony suicide attempt by Connie Madigan, an aspiring actress seeking publicity by stepping onto a ledge, Dr. Tim Kane, who practices medicine in the Broadway district of New York City, vouches for her to keep Connie from being arrested and hires her as his assistant.

Doc is warned by his Broadway cronies about gangster Vic Telli being released from prison. Doc's testimony had put Vic behind bars. Vic turns up, but impressed by Doc's honesty, says he is dying and asks Doc to find his long-missing daughter, Margie Dove, so he can bequeath her his fortune.

Vic ends up dead with rival racketeer Jack Venner trying to get his money, assisted by a woman pretending to be Margie. In the end, Doc's life is saved by Connie going back out onto the ledge, tossing a shoe at the people below. The police nab the villain and Doc helps Connie back inside, but not before kissing her.

Cast 
Macdonald Carey as Dr. Timothy Kane / Dr. Broadway
Jean Phillips as Connie Madigan
Eduardo Ciannelli as Vic Telli
Richard Lane as Police Sgt. Patric
J. Carrol Naish as Jack Venner
Joan Woodbury as Margie Dove
Arthur Loft as Capt. Mahoney
Warren Hymer as Maxie the Goat
Frank Bruno as Marty Weber
Sid Melton as Louie La Conga
Olin Howland as Professor 
Gerald Mohr as Red
Abe Dinovitch as Benny
Thomas W. Ross as Magistrate 
Charles C. Wilson as Dist. Atty. McNamara
Spencer Charters as Oscar Titus
Mary Gordon as Broadway Carrie
Jay Novello as Greeny
John Gallaudet as Al
Al Hill as Jerry

References

External links 
 

1942 films
1940s crime comedy films
American crime comedy films
American comedy mystery films
American black-and-white films
1940s comedy mystery films
1940s English-language films
Films directed by Anthony Mann
Films set in New York City
Paramount Pictures films
Films produced by Sol C. Siegel
1942 directorial debut films
1942 comedy films
Films scored by Paul Sawtell
1940s American films